Coryphomys is an extinct genus of rats, known from sub-fossils found on Timor. Its name is Greek for "top-of-the-head mouse" or "summit mouse".

Species include Coryphomys buhleri and Coryphomys musseri. Archaeological research on East Timor has revealed the bones of rats weighing up to 6 kilograms (13.2 pounds) when adult. They seem to have died out between 1000 and 2000 years ago, perhaps due to large-scale forest clearance for farming.

In 2015, the discovery of fossils of "seven new species of giant rat", including the "largest rat ever" on the island of East Timor was announced. The biggest of these rats was described as weighing "five kilos (11 pounds), the size of a small dog," and was referred to as the "Giant Rat" in news stories.

References

External links
https://web.archive.org/web/20100729135507/http://io9.com/5596239/2000+year+old-giant-rat-was-forty-times-bigger-than-its-modern-relatives
Archaeologists Discover Biggest Rat That Ever Lived: Weight of About 6 Kilograms (Over 13 Lb)
http://news.discovery.com/animals/giant-rat-fossil-discovered.html
http://www.neatorama.com/2010/07/26/skeleton-of-giant-rat-discovered/

 
Extinct mammals of Asia
Rodent genera
Extinct rodents
Holocene extinctions
Fossil taxa described in 1937